Kiris may refer to:

 Kiriş, Kemer, Turkey
 Kiris Valley, Gilgit-Baltistan, Pakistan

See also

 Keris (disambiguation)
 Kires (disambiguation)
 Kuris (disambiguation)